Tamás Varga may refer to:

 Tamás Varga (rower) (born 1978), Hungarian rower
 Tamás Varga (water polo) (born 1975), Hungarian water polo player